Zygina is a genus of leafhoppers, belonging to the family Cicadellidae.

The genus was described in 1866 by Franz Xaver Fieber.

The genus has cosmopolitan distribution.

Species:
 Zygina hyperici
 Zygina ordinaria
 Zygina rosea
 Zygina rubrovittata
 Zygina suavis
 Zygina tiliae

References

tr:Zygina

Erythroneurini
Cicadellidae genera